Nanjing College for Population Programme Management was a college in Nanjing, Jiangsu, China. Being established in 1980 and completed in 1984, the college originated the Nanjing Family Planning Cadre Training Center. It was once the sole institute administered by then National Population and Family Planning Commission until 2001, and provided degree education since 1985. It began to enrol undergraduates since 1998. Besides, United Nations Population Fund had given great support to the college.

The college was incorporated into Nanjing University of Posts and Telecommunications in 2013 with its mostly Suojincun Campus, while the rest  belongs to the Nanjing International Training Center For Population Program.

Presidents 
 Yao Jinghuang
 Si Yuanzhong
 Wang Yonghong (Jan. 2002– Dec. 2002)
 Fu Dayou (2003–2005)
 Ling Yingbin (2008–2013, 2014 administratively)

References 

Defunct universities and colleges in China